Isa Gendargenoevsky (born 1795, Gendergen, Chechnya – died 1845, Urus-Martan, Chechnya) was a Chechen general during the Russo-Caucasian War, who commanded the Eastern and Central Fronts. Isa was of the Gendargenoy teip and Appaz-Nek'e (Branch of a teip).

Biography
In 1839, in the battle of Akhulgo in Dagestan, the Imamate was completely defeated and forced Shamil to flee and hide in the mountains of Chechnya for some time. However, in the early 1840, Isa Gendergeno, already enjoying great prestige in the Caucasus, joined Shamil's cause at the Congress of Chechen warlords in the settlement of Urus-Martan. On March 8, 1840, Isa Gendergeno on behalf of the Chechens, takes on the role of leading the North Caucasian Imamate. According to major General Piryatinsky, Shamil's army, numbering 200 murids, increased by 10,000 people after the Urus-Martan Congress at the expense of Chechen units. By the mid-1840 Imam Shamil, along with Isa Gendergeno, invaded Dagestan, defeated the pro-Russian forces and established their power in large parts of the territory of Dagestan. 
After the establishment of the power of Shamil in Chechnya and Dagestan, Isa took an active part practically in all the important battles in which he achieved great success. In addition, he led the defense of Eastern and Central Chechnya.

References

1845 deaths
Chechen people
Chechen politicians
Chechen warlords
People of the Chechen wars
1795 births
Gendargenoy
Warriors from the Russian Empire
North Caucasian independence activists
Naibs of Imam Shamil